Zarynn Min (occasionally Zaryn Min; born Noraszarinawati binti Tumin; 7 December 1980) is a Malaysian actress.

Early career
Min graduated in Broadcasting from Akademi TV3 and Business Studies from Stamford College. Her first TV appearance was in Rafflesia as Hidayah for RTM (awarded Best TV Series, Anugerah Skrin 2006). Since then, she has acted in numerous TV series and tele-movies including Salam Terakhir, alongside Malaysian award-winning and popular actor, Dato’ Rosyam Nor. She debuted in Anak Mami: The Movie, followed by Dunia Baru: The Movie, Jin and Suamiku Mr. Perfect 10.

In 2010, Min appeared as a leading actress in Aalia (68 episodes for Astro Prima) as well as her first psychological thriller telefilm Gila.

Additional credit, she holds a Black Belt First Dan from Malaysia International Tae Kwon Do Federation at the age of 12 : has won a Silver and two Gold Medals throughout her active years.

She has an IQ score of 130

Nominations
 In 2011 she was nominated Best Actress In A Leading Role by the 16th Asian Television Awards for her performance in Gila.
 In 2015, she was nominated for Best Supporting Actress in Anugerah Tribute P.Ramlee for her performance in Menunggu Hujan Teduh
 In 2016 she was nominated for the same category for her performance in Aku Dan Dia.
 She received her first awards at ANUGERAH TELENOVELA 2018 for BEST SUPPORTING ACTRESS IN TELENOVELA  held in Plenary Hall KLCC.

References

1980 births
Living people
Malaysian television actresses